Karl J. Sleight is an attorney and Treasurer of the Saratoga County Bar Association (New York). He resides in Saratoga Springs, New York. In 2000, he was appointed Executive Director of the New York State Ethics Commission.

As of February 27, 2007 Sleight has resigned from the Ethics Commission to work at a private law firm, Harris Beach PLLC.

References

American lawyers
1962 births
Living people
Place of birth missing (living people)